Chaource is a French cheese, originally manufactured in the village of Chaource in the Champagne-Ardenne region.

The central pâte is soft, creamy in colour, and slightly crumbly, and is surrounded by a white Penicillium candidum rind.

History

The cheese has been made in its namesake village since at least the Middle Ages. Cheese is still manufactured there, ranging from small cheese makers to industrial-scale production further away. It is only made in a tightly controlled area in the départements of Aube and Yonne.

Manufacture

It was recognised as an Appellation d'Origine Contrôlée (AOC) cheese in 1970 and has been fully regulated since 1977.

The AOC regulations state that:

 Coagulation must be principally lactic and last for at least 12 hours.
 Drainage of the cheese must be slow and spontaneous.

Made using a similar recipe to that of Brie, affinage is usually between two and four weeks and the cheese is generally eaten young. The gently-salted central pâte has a light taste and a characteristic 'melt-in-the-mouth' texture. The fat content is a minimum of 50%.

Regulations currently allow both pasteurised or unpasteurised milk to be used during manufacture.

Style
In her 2010 book Cheese: Exploring Taste and Tradition, Patricia Michelson says: "Chaource has a bitter nutshell-like flavor, with an earthiness reminiscent of the style of the wine here, and you would think it would be a perfect match for the cheese. You should be careful to find the perfect flavor partner, however, because the cheese is also on the salty side."

See also
 List of cheeses

References 

French cheeses
Aube
French products with protected designation of origin
Cow's-milk cheeses